Raphael, or The Debauched One is a 1971 French historical drama film directed by Michel Deville. It was entered into the 1971 Cannes Film Festival.

Cast
 Maurice Ronet - Raphaël de Lorris
 Françoise Fabian - Aurore
 Jean Vilar - Horace
 Brigitte Fossey - Bernardine
 Isabelle De Funès - Émilie
 Jean-François Poron - Giorgio
 Anne Wiazemsky - Diane
 Yves Lefebvre - Paul
 Hélène Arié - Francesca
 André Oumansky - Feyrac
 Maxime Fabert - Le comte / Count
 Maurice Barrier - Lasalle
 Jean-Pierre Bernard - Norville
 Georges Claisse - Alfred
 Jacques Weber

References

External links

1971 films
1970s historical drama films
1970s French-language films
French historical drama films
Films directed by Michel Deville
Films set in the 1830s
1970s French films